Smithfield is a home rule-class city in Henry County, Kentucky, United States. The population was 106 at the 2010 census. The mayor of Smithfield is Greg Gephart.

History
Smithfield was a station on the Louisville and Cincinnati Railroad. A post office has been in operation in Smithfield since 1851.

Geography
Smithfield is located in southwestern Henry County at  (38.385521, -85.255940).

Demographics

As of the census of 2000, there were 102 people, 43 households, and 26 families residing in the city. The racial makeup of the city was 99.02% White and 0.98% Native American.

There were 43 households, out of which 30.2% had children under the age of 18 living with them, 51.2% were married couples living together, 4.7% had a female householder with no husband present, and 39.5% were non-families. 37.2% of all households were made up of individuals, and 14.0% had someone living alone who was 65 years of age or older. The average household size was 2.37 and the average family size was 3.19.

In the city, the population was spread out, with 28.4% under the age of 18, 8.8% from 18 to 24, 31.4% from 25 to 44, 23.5% from 45 to 64, and 7.8% who were 65 years of age or older. The median age was 29 years. For every 100 females, there were 121.7 males. For every 100 females age 18 and over, there were 114.7 males.

The median income for a household in the city was $26,250, and the median income for a family was $48,750. Males had a median income of $24,844 versus $30,417 for females. The per capita income for the city was $13,756. There were 10.0% of families and 18.7% of the population living below the poverty line, including 25.0% of under eighteens and none of those over 64.

References

Cities in Henry County, Kentucky
Cities in Kentucky
Louisville metropolitan area